In number theory, the Erdős–Kac theorem, named after Paul Erdős and Mark Kac, and also known as the fundamental theorem of probabilistic number theory, states that if ω(n) is the number of distinct prime factors of n, then, loosely speaking, the probability distribution of

 

is the standard normal distribution. ( is sequence A001221 in the OEIS.) This is an extension of the Hardy–Ramanujan theorem, which states that the normal order of ω(n) is log log n with a typical error of size .

Precise statement
For any fixed a < b,

where  is the normal (or "Gaussian") distribution, defined as

 

with

Kac's original heuristic

Intuitively, Kac's heuristic for the result says that if n is a randomly chosen large integer, then the number of distinct prime factors of n is approximately normally distributed with mean and variance log log n. This comes from the fact that given a random natural number n, the events "the number n is divisible by some prime p"  for each p are mutually independent.

This sum counts how many distinct prime factors our random natural number n has. It can be shown that this sum satisfies the Lindeberg condition, and therefore the Lindeberg central limit theorem guarantees that after appropriate rescaling, the above expression will be Gaussian.

The actual proof of the theorem, due to Erdős, uses sieve theory to make rigorous the above intuition.

Numerical examples
The Erdős–Kac theorem means that the construction of a number around one billion requires on average three primes.

For example, 1,000,000,003 = 23 × 307 × 141623. The following table provides a numerical summary of the growth of the average number of distinct prime factors of a natural number  with increasing .

Around 12.6% of 10,000 digit numbers are constructed from 10 distinct prime numbers and around 68% are constructed from between 7 and 13 primes.

A hollow sphere the size of the planet Earth filled with fine sand would have around 1033 grains. A volume the size of the observable universe would have around 1093 grains of sand. There might be room for 10185 quantum strings in such a universe.

Numbers of this magnitude—with 186 digits—would require on average only 6 primes for construction.

References

External links
 
 Timothy Gowers: The Importance of Mathematics (part 6, 4 mins in) and (part 7)

Kac theorem
Normal distribution
Theorems about prime numbers